Sumerian Cry is the debut album from the Swedish metal band Tiamat.

The album was recorded at Sunlight Studio, Stockholm, Sweden, in 1989, when the band was known under the original name Treblinka. The track "Sumerian Cry, Pt. 1" is a re-interpretation of the intro melody from "Crawling in Vomit", the first track off Treblinka's first demo. The track "The Sign of the Pentagram" is exclusive to the CD version of the album, and was not recorded at the same time as the rest of the album. This particular track was intended to be included on a compilation-CD released by Jon "Metalion" Kristiansen (editor of Norwegian metal fanzine Slayer). The CD was never released, and the track was included as a bonus track on this album.

"Where the Serpents Ever Dwell" was later covered by black metal band The Ruins of Beverast on the vinyl edition of their album Foulest Semen of a Sheltered Elite.

Track listing

Personnel
Johan Edlund (as Hellslaughter) – rhythm and lead guitars, keyboards, lead vocals
Jörgen Thullberg (as Juck) – bass
Stefan Lagergren (as Emetic) – lead and rhythm guitars
Anders Holmberg (as Najse) – drums

Only photos of Hellslaughter and Juck are shown on the backcover, because Emetic and Najse were ex-members when the record came out.

References

1990 debut albums
Tiamat (band) albums